Geometry is a branch of mathematics dealing with spatial relationships.

Geometry or geometric may also refer to:
Geometric distribution of probability theory and statistics
Geometric series, a mathematical series with a constant ratio between successive terms
Geometric (typeface classification), a class of sans-serif typeface styles

Music
Geometry (Robert Rich album), a 1991 album by American musician Robert Rich
Geometry (Ivo Perelman album), a 1997 album by Brazilian saxophonist Ivo Perelman
Geometry (Jega album), a 2000 album by English musician Jega

Transport
Geometry (car marque) Chinese car brand manufactured by Geely

People
Gia Metric, Canadian drag queen

See also